The 2011–12 Basketball League Belgium Division I, for sponsorships reasons named 2011–12 Ethias League, was the 84th season of the Ethias League, the top tier basketball in Belgium. The season started on October 4, 2011, and finished in May 2012. Telenet BC Oostende took the title after beating Belgacom Spirou in five games.

Teams 
Belgacom Liège Basket
Belgacom Spirou Basket
Dexia Mons-Hainaut
Generali Okapi Aalstar
Optima Gent
Port of Antwerp Giants
Stella Artois Leuven Bears
Telenet BC Oostende
VOO Verviers-Pepinster

Regular season

Playoffs

Awards
Most Valuable Player
 Christopher Copeland (Okapi Aalstar)
Coach of the Year
 Bradley Dean (Generali Okapi Aalstar)
Most Promising Player
 Jean-Marc Mwema (Antwerp Giants)
Star of the Coaches
 Christopher Copeland (Generali Okapi Aalstar)
Belgian Player of the Year
 Jorn Steinbach (Generali Okapi Aalstar)

References

External links 
 Ethias League

Basketball League Belgium Division I seasons
Belgian
Lea